A rice pounder is an agricultural tool, a simple machine that is commonly used in Southeast Asia to dehull rice or to turn rice into rice flour. The device has similar functionality to a mortar and pestle, but with more mechanical advantage to conserve labor. Rice is dehulled by continually raising and then dropping the heavy head or pestle of the pounder into a block or mortar.

Some rice pounders are foot-operated; the head is raised by standing on the handle of the device past its fulcrum (similar to a see-saw). Once raised, the user quickly steps off of the handle, allowing the heavy head to fall into the mortar and pulverize its contents. In Bengal (West Bengal, India and Bangladesh), this is called Dhenki, and is still used traditionally in the villages for personal use. This is because it preserves the brown rice coating that is perceived as a healthy part. However, because it is so labor-intensive, its use is gradually decreasing.

Recently, complex mechanical dehuskers or rice hullers powered by gas engines or electricity have replaced many rice pounders.

See also
 Makitra
 Metate
 Millstone
 Muddler
 Mochi, the rice cake made by pounding glutinous rice with mallets 
 Molcajete
 Oralu kallu
 Rice hulls
 Winnowing barn

References

External links
Water Powered Rice Mill
Rice Pounder Video

Food grinding tools
Food preparation appliances